The European University of Tirana (UET) is an accredited private  university in Tirana, Albania.  It was established in 2006 by four PhD students (at the time): Adri Nurellari, Blendi Kajsiu, Ermal Hasimja, and Henri Çili, in collaboration with business manager Laert Duraj and journalist Robert Rakipllari.

UET was licensed by the Albanian Ministry of Education & Sciences on 20 September 2006 following the decision of the Council of Ministers Nr. 636/2006 and is fully accredited by the Quality Assurance Agency of Higher Education.

Academics
The European University of Tirana (UET) awards Bachelor Degrees which usually take 3 years to be completed. It also offers Professional Masters, which last 1-1.5 years, and Scientific Masters, which last for 2 years.  In 2011, the University acquired the right to award Doctorate Degrees in Social, Economic and Judicial Sciences.

Webometrics Ranking of World Universities, ranked UET as the 7th top Higher Education Institution in the nation.

Organisation

Undergraduate  

UET has three Faculties:

Faculty of Law:
Department of General Law

Faculty of Social Sciences and Communication:
Department of Political Science
Department of International Relations
Department of Public Relations
Department of Design
Department of Sociology & Social Anthropology
Department of Psychology

Faculty of Economics and Information Technology:
Department of Finance Banking
Department of Business Management
Department of Information Economics (Business Management)
Department of Information Economics (Finance Banking)

Professional Master 
The European University of Tirana offers about 24 Professional Masters and Master of Science programs in these fields of study: Economics, Finance, Corporate Governance, Management, Marketing, Information Economics, Public Law, International Law, Business Law, Private Law, Communication Sciences, Political Sciences, International Relations, Sociology & Social Anthropology, Psychology and Science Education. Currently there are 7 new programs of study in the process of being licensed.

Faculty of Law
 Justice
Faculty of Economics and Information Technology
 Finance
 Corporate Governing
 Marketing
 Business Management
 Applied Informatics
Faculty of Social Sciences and Education
 Public Relations
 Political Sciences
 International Relations - Diplomacy
 Teaching
 School Psychology

Science Master 
The European University of Tirana offers about 24 Professional Master’s and Master of Science programs in these fields of study: Economics, Finance, Management, Marketing, Information Economics, Public Law, International Law, Business Law, Private Law, Science Communication, Political Sciences, International Relations, Sociology & Social Anthropology, Psychology and Science Education. Currently there are 7 new programs of study in the process of being licensed.

Faculty of Law
 Private and Business Law
 Criminal Law
 Public and International Law
Faculty of Economics and Information Technology
 Finance Banking
 Business Administration
 Economic Informatics
Faculty of Social Sciences and Education
 Communication – Public Relations
 Political Sciences
 International Relations
 Sociology – Social Anthropology
 Psychology
 Education Sciences

International Collaboration
The European University of Tirana encourages international cooperation and the transfer of lecturers and students between partner institutions.  It also has study abroad programs for one semester or one academic year with partner Universities, including Aston University, in Birmingham, UK.  The two Universities intend to further their cooperation by offering joint Doctorates in the near future. UET has also signed cooperation agreements with Panthéon-Assas University, France; the University of Bari, Italy; Bar-Ilan University, Israel; the University of Montenegro, Montenegro; South East European University, Macedonia; the University of Marseille, France; and the University of Santiago, Chile.

In May 2010 EUT became a member of the Interuniversity Centre for Research and Cooperation with Eastern and South Eastern Europe (CIRCEOS), in Bari, Italy.

See also

List of universities in Albania
List of colleges and universities
List of colleges and universities by country

References

European University of Tirana
Educational institutions established in 2006
Universities and colleges in Tirana
2006 establishments in Albania